James Peter Walker (March 14, 1851 – July 19, 1890) was a U.S. Representative from Missouri.

Early years
Born near Memphis, Tennessee, Walker attended the public schools and the boys' college at Durhamville, Tennessee.

Career
He was employed in early youth as a clerk in a country store.
He moved to Missouri in 1867 and settled near Kennett, Dunklin County.
He engaged in agricultural pursuits.
He moved to Point Pleasant, New Madrid County, in 1871 and engaged in transportation on the Mississippi River.
He engaged in the dry-goods business at Dexter, Missouri, in 1876, and later, in 1882, in the buying and selling of grain.
He served as delegate to the Democratic National Convention in 1880.
He was an unsuccessful candidate for the Democratic nomination for Congress in 1884.

Walker was elected as a Democrat to the fiftieth and fifty-first Congresses and served from March 4, 1887, until his death.
He was unanimously nominated as the Democratic candidate for reelection to the fifty-second Congress on the day of his death.

Death
He died July 19, 1890, in Dexter, Missouri from an influenza epidemic that had hit the area. He was interred in Dexter Cemetery.

See also
List of United States Congress members who died in office (1790–1899)

References

External links
 
 

1851 births
1890 deaths
Deaths from the 1889–1890 flu pandemic
Infectious disease deaths in Missouri
Democratic Party members of the United States House of Representatives from Missouri
19th-century American politicians
People from Kennett, Missouri
People from New Madrid County, Missouri
People from Dexter, Missouri